The 2010 Assen Superbike World Championship round was the fourth round of the 2010 Superbike World Championship season. It took place on the weekend of April 23–25, 2010 at the TT Circuit Assen located in Assen, Netherlands.

Results

Superbike race 1 classification

Superbike race 2 classification

Supersport race classification

External links
 The official website of the TT Circuit Assen
 The official website of the Superbike World Championship

Assen Round